East Dixfield is an unincorporated village in the towns of Wilton in Franklin County and Dixfield in Oxford County, in the U.S. state of Maine. East Dixfield has a post office with ZIP code 04227.

References

Villages in Franklin County, Maine
Villages in Oxford County, Maine
Villages in Maine